St. Martin is a census-designated place (CDP) in Jackson County, Mississippi, United States. It is part of the Pascagoula Metropolitan Statistical Area. The population was 7,730 at the 2010 census, up from 6,676 at the 2000 census.

Geography
St. Martin is located along the Mississippi Gulf Coast at  (30.441847, -88.870402). It is south of Interstate 10 and is bordered by the CDP of Gulf Hills to the east, Biloxi Bay to the south, and the city of D'Iberville to the west.
 
St. Martin has either Biloxi or Ocean Springs mailing addresses. The ZIP codes are either 39532 or 39564.

Demographics

2020 census

As of the 2020 United States census, there were 7,811 people, 2,977 households, and 1,645 families residing in the CDP.

2000 census
As of the census of 2000, there were 6,676 people, 2,387 households, and 1,833 families residing in the CDP.  The population density was 1,528.0 people per square mile (589.8/km).  There were 2,534 housing units at an average density of 580.0/sq mi (223.9/km).  The racial makeup of the CDP was 82.70% White, 7.94% African American, 0.52% Native American, 6.95% Asian, 0.07% Pacific Islander, 0.42% from other races, and 1.39% from two or more races. Hispanic or Latino of any race were 1.92% of the population.

There were 2,387 households, of which 36.5% had children under the age of 18 living with them, 56.6% were married couples living together, 14.7% had a female householder with no husband present, and 23.2% were non-families. 18.6% of all households were made up of individuals, and 7.5% had someone living alone who was 65 years of age or older. The average household size was 2.80 and the average family size was 3.17.

In the CDP, the population was spread out, with 27.3% under the age of 18, 8.7% from 18 to 24, 29.7% from 25 to 44, 23.8% from 45 to 64, and 10.5% who were 65 years of age or older. The median age was 36 years. For every 100 females, there were 96.6 males. For every 100 females age 18 and over, there were 94.1 males.

The median income for a household in the CDP was $41,167, and the median income for a family was $46,559. Males had a median income of $31,213 versus $22,958 for females. The per capita income for the CDP was $16,439. About 7.1% of families and 10.7% of the population were below the poverty line, including 14.0% of those under age 18 and 20.7% of those age 65 or over.

Public safety

Fire department
The West Jackson County Fire Department provides fire protection for the community.

Law enforcement
The Jackson County Sheriff's Office provides law enforcement services for the community.

Education
St. Martin is served by the Jackson County School District. It includes three elementary schools, one middle school, and one high school. St. Martin is also home to a branch of the Jackson-George Regional Library, located at 15004 LeMoyne Boulevard.

Elementary schools
 St. Martin North Elementary (K-3)
 St. Martin East Elementary (K-3)
 St. Martin Upper Elementary (4-5)

Middle schools
 St. Martin Middle School (6-8)

High schools
 St. Martin High School (9-12)

These schools have been consecutively rated as Tier 5 schools due to their excellence.

References

Census-designated places in Jackson County, Mississippi
Census-designated places in Mississippi
Pascagoula metropolitan area